The Very Best Things (1995–2008) is a greatest hits compilation album by American rock band Filter. It was released on March 31, 2009 through Rhino Records.

Overview
The album contains songs from Filter's first four studio albums: Short Bus, Title of Record, The Amalgamut, and Anthems for the Damned. Additionally, the compilation features songs from The Crow: City of Angels Soundtrack, Spawn: The Album, The X-Files: The Album, and Songs in the Key of X. All of the songs were remastered for the compilation.

Track listing

Personnel
Filter
Richard Patrick – lead vocals, guitar, programming, keyboards, bass, drums
Brian Liesegang – guitar, programming, keyboards, drums (tracks 1, 3, 4 and 8)
Geno Lenardo – guitar, bass, programming (tracks 2, 5, 7, 9, 10, 12, 13)
John 5 – guitar (track 6)
Frank Cavanagh – bass (tracks 2, 5, 7, 9, 10, 12, 13)
Steven Gillis – drums (tracks 2, 5, 7, 9, 10, 12, 13)
Josh Freese – drums (track 6)

References

2009 greatest hits albums
Filter (band) albums
Rhino Records compilation albums